The Tongue River Dam is a dam in Big Horn County, Montana, a few miles north of the Wyoming state border. It impounds the Tongue River, creating the Tongue River Reservoir.

It impounds Montana's north-flowing Tongue River for flood control and irrigation water storage. The dam and reservoir are owned and operated by the Montana Department of Natural Resources and Conservation.

Recreation includes boating, fishing for bass, crappie, walleye and northern pike, and camping in the Tongue River Reservoir State Park. For white-water rafters the Tongue is a Class I river from the Dam downstream (northward) to its confluence with the Yellowstone River.

References

Dams in Montana
Reservoirs in Montana
United States state-owned dams
Buildings and structures in Big Horn County, Montana
Dams completed in 1939
Landforms of Big Horn County, Montana
1939 establishments in Montana